Jay R. Elkin is an American politician and businessman serving as a member of the North Dakota Senate from the 36th district. Elected in November 2020, he assumed office on December 3, 2018.

Education 
Elkin attended Bismarck State College and North Dakota State University, but did not earn a degree.

Career 
Elkin has owned and operated a ranch. He also served as a member of the Stark County Commission. Elkin was elected to the North Dakota Senate in November 2020 and assumed office on December 3, 2018, succeeding Kelly Armstrong. In the 2021–2022 legislative session, Elkin is the vice chair of the Senate Education Committee.

References 

Living people
Republican Party North Dakota state senators
People from Stark County, North Dakota
Year of birth missing (living people)